The men's 400 metres event at the 2020 Summer Olympics took place between 1 and 5 August 2021 at the Olympic Stadium. Approximately fifty athletes were expected to compete; the exact number was dependent on how many nations use universality places to enter athletes in addition to the 48 qualifying through time or ranking (3 universality places were used in 2016). 48 athletes from 33 nations competed. The event was won by Steven Gardiner of the Bahamas, with Anthony Zambrano of Colombia taking silver. Those were the first medals in the men's 400 metres for each of those two nations. Kirani James of Grenada won his third consecutive medal in the event with his bronze, making him the first man to earn three medals in the 400 metres.

Summary
Wayde van Niekerk's world record in Rio put this event in the spotlight. This year, van Niekerk was back to defend, but he was not the same after a 2017 ACL injury during a celebrity rugby match. Silver medalist and 2012 Olympic Champion Kirani James was back from the podium on Rio. The 2019 World Championships presented a completely different set of names, Steven Gardiner, Anthony Zambrano and Fred Kerley, but Kerley focused his efforts on the 100m, netting himself a silver medal in that event. Earlier in the season, Randolph Ross joined the sub 44 club. And other than van Niekerk, the fastest personal record in the field belonged to Indoor World Record holder Michael Norman at 43.45 for =#4 all time.

The first semi final revealed James was in top form, running 43.88. Immediately behind him, Zambrano became the 18th member of the sub 44 club with 43.93. The other semi finals were a little more sane. Deon Lendore ran 44.93 and didn't make the final.

Five members of the sub 44 club were in the final. Starting fast, Norman, Michael Cherry, James and Isaac Makwala made up most of the stagger on the athletes to their outside, Christopher Taylor, Gardiner, Zambrano and Liemarvin Bonevacia respectively. Down the backstretch, Norman and James kept up the pressure, while Cherry and Makwala backed off. Gardiner began to speed up chasing Norman, visible to his outside. Through the final turn Gardiner gained on Norman. To the inside, Zambrano seemed to be marking James who had already made up the stagger and was inside of him. And Makwala ran a strong turn. Coming onto the home straight, James had the edge, with Makwala and Gardiner next, with Norman and Zambrano a metre behind them. James began to strain, Norman and Makwala were losing ground as Gardiner cruised past him into the lead. Zambrano was running fastest of all, passing James. Cherry passed Norman and set sail after James. Gardiner crossed the finish line, easing up with a 2 metre victory. Zambrano had a metre and a half on James and Cherry dipping at the finish line. James got the nod for bronze to complete his set of medals.

Background
This was the 29th appearance of the event, which is one of 12 athletics events to have been held at every Summer Olympics.

For the first time in Olympic history, no nations made their men's 400 metres debut this Games. The United States made its 28th appearance, most of any nation, having missed only the boycotted 1980 Games.

Qualification

A National Olympic Committee (NOC) could enter up to 3 qualified athletes in the men's 400 metres event if all athletes meet the entry standard or qualify by ranking during the qualifying period. (The limit of 3 has been in place since the 1930 Olympic Congress.) The qualifying standard is 44.90 seconds. This standard was "set for the sole purpose of qualifying athletes with exceptional performances unable to qualify through the IAAF World Rankings pathway." The world rankings, based on the average of the best five results for the athlete over the qualifying period and weighted by the importance of the meet, will then be used to qualify athletes until the cap of 48 is reached.

The qualifying period was originally from 1 May 2019 to 29 June 2020. Due to the COVID-19 pandemic, the period was suspended from 6 April 2020 to 30 November 2020, with the end date extended to 29 June 2021. The world rankings period start date was also changed from 1 May 2019 to 30 June 2020; athletes who had met the qualifying standard during that time were still qualified, but those using world rankings would not be able to count performances during that time. The qualifying time standards could be obtained in various meets during the given period that have the approval of the IAAF. Both indoor and outdoor meets are eligible. The most recent Area Championships may be counted in the ranking, even if not during the qualifying period.

NOCs can also use their universality place—each NOC can enter one male athlete regardless of time if they had no male athletes meeting the entry standard for an athletics event—in the 400 metres.

Entry number: 48.

Competition format
The event continued to use the three-round format introduced in 2004. There were 6 heats, with the top 3 in each heat and the next 6 fastest overall advancing to the semifinals. There were 3 semifinals, with the top 2 in each semifinal and the next 2 overall advancing to the final.

Records
Prior to this competition, the existing world and Olympic records were as follows.

The following national records were established during the competition:

Schedule
All times are Japan Standard Time (UTC+9)

The men's 400 metres took place over three separate days.

Results

Round 1
Qualification rule: first 3 of each heat (Q) plus the 6 fastest times (q) qualified.

Heat 1

Heat 2

Heat 3

Heat 4

Heat 5

Heat 6

Semifinals
Qualification rule: first 2 of each heat (Q) plus the 2 fastest times (q) qualified.

Semifinal 1

Semifinal 2

Semifinal 3

Final

References

Men's 400 metres
2020
Men's events at the 2020 Summer Olympics